DDR2 or DDRII may refer to:
 DDR2 SDRAM, the computer memory technology
 Dance Dance Revolution 2ndMix, a 1999 video game
 Dance Dance Revolution II, a 2011 video game
 DDR2 (gene), a human gene